The Pricot de Sainte-Marie steles are more than 2,000 Punic funerary steles found in Carthage (modern Tunisia) near the ancient forum by French diplomat Jean-Baptiste Evariste Charles Pricot de Sainte-Marie in the late 19th century. The find was dramatic both in the scale—the largest single discovery of Canaanite and Aramaic inscriptions—and also due to the finds almost being lost in the sinking of the French ironclad Magenta at Toulon.

The steles were found in their secondary location, having been re-used as building material for a wall in a structure erected after the city had been destroyed by the Romans.

The steles provide evidence of Carthaginian religion prior to the Roman occupation.

Pricot de Sainte-Marie obtained financial support from the French Académie des Inscriptions et Belles-Lettres to create a complication for publication in the Corpus Inscriptionum Semiticarum. He took stampings of all the 2,170 steles he excavated, and had sent these to France prior to the sinking of the Magenta. They were later compiled and published in the Corpus Inscriptionum Semiticarum.

After the sinking of the Magenta, a large number of the steles were recovered. They now reside at the Bibliothèque nationale de France and the Louvre.

Recovery
Around 1,500 of the steles were recovered shortly after the sinking.

On 19 April 1994, the French Groupe de Recherche en Archéologie Navale led by Max Guérout, located the Magenta 50 feet below the surface, under four feet of sediment. The expedition had been catalyzed in 1992 by historian Serge Lancel and an amateur French archaeologist, Jean-Pierre Laporte. Guérout's team carried out 843 dives between 1994 and 1998, recovering 115 steles and fragments from the wreckage. Guérout estimated in 1999 that nearly 400 more steles may remain in the wreck.

Examples of inscriptions
Text KAI 86 (= CIS I 264 = KI 76) reads:

{|
|+ 
|-
| (line 1) || rowspan="5" |   || LRBT LTNT PNB‘L || rowspan="5" |   || [Stele dedicated] to the Lady Tinnīt-Phanebal || rowspan="5" | 
|-
| (1-2) || W/L’DN LB‘L ḤMN || and to the Lord Baal-hammon, 
|-
| (2-3) || ’Š N/DR ‘BDMLKT || that Abdmilkot has vowed,
|-
| (3-4) || BN ’ŠTR/TYTN || the son of Astartyaton,
|-
| (4) || ’Š B‘M RŠ MLQRT ||  a member of the people of Rūs Milqart [= Heraclea Minoa, Sicily].
|-
|}

KAI 87 (= CIS I 221 = KI 80). Ḥōt-’Ilot, the woman who ordered this stele, belonged to Carthage's elite: both her father and grandfather were head of state in Carthage (suffes):

{|
|+ 
|-
| (lines 1-2) || rowspan="5" |   || [L]RBT LTMT / [P]NB‘L || rowspan="5" |   || [Stele dedicated] [to] the Lady Ti[nn]īt-[Ph]anebal || rowspan="4" | 
|-
| (2-3) || WL’D/N LBḤLMN ||  and to the Lord Baal-hammon,
|-
| (3-4) || ’Š / N‘DR ḤTLT  || that Ḥōt-’Ilot has vowed,
|-
| (4-5) || BT / ḤN’ ’ŠPṬ || the daughter of Hanno the suffes,
|-
| (5-6) || BN / ‘ZMLK ’ŠPṬ || the son of ‘Az-Milk the suffes.
|-
|}

KAI 88 (= CIS I 1885 = KI 83):

{|
|+ 
|-
| (line 1) || rowspan="7" |   || LRBT LTNT PNB‘L || rowspan="7" |   || [Stele dedicated] to the Lady Tinnīt-Phanebal || rowspan="7" | 
|-
| (1-2) || WL’/[DN] LB‘L ḤMN || and to the L[ord] Baal-hammon,
|-
| (2-3) ||  ’Š NDR/’ [M]TNB‘L ’ŠT ‘BDM/LQRT || that [M]attanbal has vowed, the wife of Abdmilqart,
|-
| (4) || BN B‘LḤN’ || the son of Baalhanno,
|-
| (4-5) || BN / BD‘ŠTRT || the grandson of Bodastart (Bostar);
|-
| (5) || K ŠM’ QL’ || for He [the god] heard her [Mattanbal's] voice (prayer).
|-
| (6) || YBRK’ || May He bless her!
|-
|}

The proper names in those inscriptions are common ones. Their meanings are usually evident: ’Abdmilkot ("servant of the Queen"), Astartyaton ("Astarte has given"), Ḥōt-’Ilot ("’Ilot is [my] sister"), Hanno and Baalhanno ("he/Baal has shown him favor"), ‘Az-Milk ("Strong is [the] King"), Mattanbal ("gift of Baal"), and Bodastart ("in the service of Astarte").

Concordance

Summary
In all, Pricot de Sainte-Marie documented 2,576 Carthaginian tombstones:
 184 in private collections (see below)
 19 excavated 1874-75 sent to the Louvre
 2170 excavated 1874-75, stampings sent to the Bibliotheque Nationale
 203 further steles sent in 1878

Private collections
Pricot de Sainte-Marie documented 184 steles in private collections:

2170 inscription stampings sent to the AIBL
Pricot de Sainte-Marie had taken stampings of all the steles he excavated, and had sent these to France prior to the sinking of the Magenta. They were later compiled and published in the Corpus Inscriptionum Semiticarum.

CIS

Later concordances

Bibliography
 
 
 Laporte Jean-Pierre. Carthage: les stèles Sainte-Marie. In: Bulletin de la Société Nationale des Antiquaires de France, 1999, 2002. pp. 133-146. DOI: 10.3406/bsnaf.2002.10363
 
 Lancel Serge. La fouille de l'épave du Magenta et le sauvetage de sa cargaison archéologique. In: Comptes rendus des séances de l'Académie des Inscriptions et Belles-Lettres, 139ᵉ année, N. 3, 1995. pp. 813-816. DOI: 10.3406/crai.1995.15521

References

Phoenician inscriptions
Steles
Phoenician steles
KAI inscriptions
Archaeological artifacts